The Draper Baronetcy, of Sunninghill in the County of Berkshire, was a title in the Baronetage of England. It was created on 9 June 1660 for Thomas Draper, High Sheriff of Berkshire from 1660 to 1661. The title became extinct on his death in 1703.

Draper baronets, of Sunninghill (1660)
Sir Thomas Draper, 1st Baronet (died 1703)

References

Extinct baronetcies in the Baronetage of England
People from Sunninghill